Krishnapur is a municipality in Kanchanpur District in Sudurpashchim Province of the far-western development region of Nepal. In the 2011 national census, there were 36,706 people living in 6,723 individual households. It was formed as municipality in 2015 by merger of Krishnapur VDC, Raikwar Bichwa VDC and part of Dekathbhuli VDC.

Economy
Krishnapur Municipality is a growing city in Kanchanpur District. The main centre of Krishnapur is Gulariya bazar, located in centre part of Krishnapur Municipality. Other economic centres are Bani Bazar, Bank Bazar, Gulariya Bazar, Tara Bazar, etc. The main occupation of people here is agriculture.

References

Populated places in Kanchanpur District
Nepal municipalities established in 2015
Municipalities in Kanchanpur District